The 1974 UCI Road World Championships took place on 25 August 1974 in Montreal, Quebec, Canada.

The Grand Prix Cycliste de Montréal and the 1976 Summer Olympics follows a similar course to this World Championship. It was the 47th edition of the tournament and the first to be hosted outside Europe.

Results

Medal table

References

External links 

 Men's results
 Women's results
  Results at sportpro.it

 
UCI Road World Championships by year
UCI Road World Championships 1974
Sports competitions in Montreal
1974 in road cycling
Uci Road World Championships, 1974